Slappily Married is an American short subject by Columbia Pictures, released on November 7, 1946. The short was directed by Edward Bernds and stars Joe DeRita, who later joined the Three Stooges and became "Curly Joe" DeRita, and features Christine McIntyre, Dorothy Granger and Dick Wessel. It is the first of four shorts in the Joe DeRita series produced by Columbia from 1946-1948; all entries were remakes of other Columbia shorts.

Plot
Dress shop owner Joe Bates (Joe DeRita) is a happily married man who dreads Friday the 13th. Fearing the worst, Joe decides to stay home to avoid any catastrophes, but his wife (Christine McIntyre) tells him that he is being superstitious. Joe agrees with her and decides to start preparing breakfast, but things quickly go wrong. Food starts flying everywhere, dishes fall and break all over the place and a mixing bowl of waffle batter drapes all over Joe. When his wife returns to the kitchen, she tells him that yesterday was Friday the 13th and to start getting ready for work.

Later at the dress shop, Joe mistakes a female customer (Dorothy Granger) for a mannequin. When her jealous fiancee (Dick Wessel) goes over to see what is going on, a nervous Joe tells him that it was a misunderstanding. Another problem occurs shortly after when the same customer and another one (Jean Willes) get into a scuffle involving a hat they both want to purchase. Joe tries to break up the fight, but gets knocked to the floor along with the first customer. The fiancee, as well as Joe's wife, shows up again, with Joe's wife thinking that he is cheating on him and runs off, leaving Joe to get punched out by the fiancee.

Joe eventually tracks down his wife at the Amazon hotel, for women only. The concierge (Symona Boniface) tells Joe that she was given orders that his wife does not want to be disturbed, but Joe manages to disguise himself as a woman to find his wife's room, but winds up in the one of the female customer he met earlier and also has to dodge her fiancee and a female house detective, before finally reuniting with his wife at the end.

Cast
Joe DeRita - Joe Bates
Christine McIntyre - Mrs. Bates
Dorothy Granger - Honey 
Dick Wessel - Honey's husband 
Jean Willes - Dress store customer 
Symona Boniface - Hotel desk clerk
Florence Auer - Violet, hotel matron

Production notes
Slappily Married is a remake of the 1943 Andy Clyde short A Maid Made Mad.

DeRita did not think highly of his output at Columbia Pictures, once commenting, "My comedy in those scripts was limited to getting hit on the head with something, then going over to my screen wife to say, 'Honey, don't leave me!' For this kind of comedy material, you could have gotten a busboy to do it and it would have been just as funny."

References

External links

Slappily Married at threestooges.net

1946 films
Columbia Pictures short films
Short film remakes
Films directed by Edward Bernds
American black-and-white films
American comedy short films
1946 comedy films
1940s American films
1940s English-language films